The Pacific Harbor Line  was formed in 1998 to take over the Harbor Belt Line (HBL). In 1998, the Alameda Corridor was nearing completion, allowing for a massive amount of railroad traffic from the largest harbors in the Western hemisphere: Port of Los Angeles and Port of Long Beach.

Overview 
The PHL was formed to create a level playing field for shippers. Up to that time, the HBL was owned and operated by the major railroads in Los Angeles; the Southern Pacific, the Santa Fe Railway and the Union Pacific. One of the problems with the HBL arrangement was that a shipper could have problems getting their goods to or from the port depending on where an individual railroad's track ended.

The PHL, privately owned by the Anacostia & Pacific Company, operates on tracks and facilities owned by the ports. The PHL is a neutral switching railroad that serves shippers at this large port complex. PHL handles 40,000 carloads of freight a year excluding intermodal traffic. The Alameda Corridor provides rail service to port complex through BNSF and UP railroads.

PHL was the first railroad to have its locomotive fleet composed only of Tier II and Tier III "clean diesel" locomotives.

Pacific Harbor Line was named the 2009 Short Line Railroad of the Year by Railway Age magazine.

In July 2013, Pacific Harbor Line signed a new five-year collective agreement with the Brotherhood of Locomotive Engineers and Trainmen (BLET). BLET has represented workers at the company since PHL was formed in 1998.

References

Further reading

External links 

About PHL founding

California railroads
Switching and terminal railroads